Rube Ferns (born James Ferns; October 30, 1873 – June 11, 1952) was an American boxer of the early 20th century. Nicknamed "The Kansas Rube", he held the World Welterweight Championship in 1900 and 1901.  He was formidable and scrappy with a good punch.

He defeated such men as "Mysterious" Billy Smith, Eddie Connolly, Bobby Dobbs, William "Matty" Matthews, Frank Erne, Owen Zeigler, "Scaldy" Bill Quinn, Harry Pigeon, Frank "Dutch" Neal, Paddy Purtell and Shorty Ahearn. He lost his title to Barbados Joe Walcott in December 1901. He was known as a powerful hitter with an impressive knockout record.

Early career
One reporter described Ferns as "one of the queerest and most eccentric practitioners in a profession that has attracted many freaks".  He was born into a coal-mining family in Pennsylvania. In 1880 they moved to Central Illinois and finally settled in Scammon, Kansas in 1886. Many of his early bouts took place in nearby Pittsburg, Kansas thus creating confusion about his early years. He always dressed like a stage farmer in go-to-meeting clothes...Ferns was tall and angular and did not look like a fighter.  According to BoxRec, Ferns began his career by 1896 with six straight knockouts of boxers Jack Dougherty, Tom Mackey, Harry Pigeon, Cass Whitman, Ed Doyle, and Fred Ross.  Half of these fights were known to have been in the Southeast Kansas area, in Cherokee and Crawford counties.  In 1897, Ferns fought in some larger cities and New England venues, meeting Kid Gardner in a draw in Chicago in February, and Izzy Straus and Lou 
Demonge in Brooklyn Clubs in June.  In July, he lost to Bobby Dobbs in Hartford, Connecticut.

Taking the World Welterweight Title

On January 15, 1900, Ferns fought his first bout billed as a World Welterweight Title, defeating "Mysterious" Billy Smith at the Hawthorne Athletic Club in Buffalo, New York.  According to BoxRec, Smith knocked Ferns down fifteen times before fouling him and losing the fight in the twenty first of twenty-five rounds, indicating Fern's claim to the title was not firmly established by this bout. Ferns' second defeat of Smith on August 30 gave him a more authoritative claim to the title as he won a more decisive victory and had defeated several important contenders prior to the fight.

Smith was legendary for his dirty fighting tactics.  Eddie McBride, referee for the January 15, 1900 bout in Buffalo bout between Smith and Ferns wrote, "The nastiest fight I ever refereed was between Rube Ferns and Mysterious Billy Smith, the toughest mortal that ever entered a ring.  Smith was exceptionally dirty that night and repeated warnings for hitting in clinches having no effect.  I disqualified him...in the 23rd.  Smith had deliberately leaned over Fern's shoulder and expectorated in my face". McBride had actually disqualified Smith in the 21st round, and it was an important bout, marking the assumption of the World Welterweight Title by Ferns according to many sources.<ref>Andrews, Tom, "McBride Saw Vision of Cell When Weining was Knocked Out", The Day Book", p. 20, Chicago, Illinois, 28 February 1912</ref>

On August 13, 1900, Ferns defended his World Welterweight Championship against contender Eddie Connolly, before a crowd of 1800 at the Olympic Club in Buffalo in a fifteenth-round technical knockout of a planned twenty-five.  In the final round, Connolly through up his hands after three light shots to the ribs, indicating he could not continue the bout, and his seconds threw in the towel. 

Ferns fought three more bouts in 1900 that increased his recognition as the primary World Welterweight Title contender, and helped him to gain full recognition as the champion.  In February, he defeated Mike Donovan again at the Hawthorne Athletic Club in Baltimore in a 20-round points decision listed as the 145 pound championship of the world.  He knocked out Jack Hanley on March 20, 1900, in a non-title bout in six rounds in Fort Erie, Ontario.  More significantly, Ferns convincingly knocked out Jack Bennett in the first of twenty rounds in Toronto, Ontario, Canada.  The BBBC recognized this title as both the American and World Welterweight boxing title in their 2004 Boxing Yearbook. 

Historic bouts with Matty Matthews

Continuing to establish his legacy as the Welterweight Championship, Ferns defeated Matty Matthews on August 30, 1900, at the Lightguard Armory in Detroit, Michigan in a fifteen-round points decision.  The Detroit Free Press wrote, "Rube Ferns demonstrated that he is a hard hitting, game and dangerous man and clearly entitled to the honor which he now holds, that of welterweight champion."Bo Needham, Detroit Free Press, Detroit, Michigan, 2 September 1900

In two rematches with Matthews for the World Title, Ferns lost on October 16, 1900, in a full fifteen round points decision losing the title though suffering from open sores.  Ferns re-took the title on May 24, 1901, in Toronto, Ontario, Canada in a tenth-round knockout which may have been a close bout prior to the final blow.  The Bridgeport Herald wrote "that in the tenth round Ferns landed a stomach blow, followed by a punch to the head that knocked out Matthews.  The Pittsburgh Press further authenticated the passing of the title from Matty Matthews to Ferns, when it wrote of the May 24, 1901 bout, "Matty Matthews, the New Yorker, who held the title stacked up against Rube Ferns, of Kansas, and was laid low in ten rounds."  Showing there was some flex among boxing reporters as to when Ferns first took the title, the Milwaukee-Journal recognized that Ferns first took the title in his defeat of Mysterious Smith, passing the title to Ferns in the process as early as January 1900, but Fern's assumption of the title is also widely recognized with his October 16, 1900 defeat of Matty Matthews."Smith First Champ",Milwaukee-Journal, p. 12, Milwaukee, Wisconsin, 28 May 1935

Ferns had two more important defenses of the Welterweight title, first on September 23, 1901, against the lightweight champion Frank Erne in front of an enthusiastic crowd of 4,500 at the International Athletic Club in Ft. Erie, Ontario, Canada in a ninth-round knockout.

In another bout which was very likely a title defense, Ferns defeated Charles Dutch Thurston on November 28, 1901, at the Light Guard Armory in Detroit, Michigan in a full fifteen round points decision.

Losing the Welterweight World Championship

On December 18, 1901, Ferns lost the Welterweight Championship of the World to the great Barbados Joe Walcott, one of the greatest lightweights in boxing history.  Walcott defeated Ferns in a fifth-round TKO at the International Athletic Club in Fort Erie, Ontario.  The Toronto Star wrote "Walcott battered down Ferns with terrific body blows, and right and left swings to the head. To save Ferns from being completely knocked out, Referee McBride stopped the bout."  The Richmond Dispatch'', running the same story, continued, "In the fifth and last round Walcott sent Ferns to the boards on two occasions, and Rube twice took the count. When he rose the second time, he was in a weakened condition."  The bout was described as "the fastest and fiercest ever fought in the new club-house."

Boxing achievements
When Ferns first took the welterweight title may be in minor dispute, as many sources recognize Fern's claim to the title as early as his defeat of Mysterious Billy Smith on January 15, 1900, though Smith did not as he claimed he was winning the fight before his disqualification, and the claim had some validity.  Ferns defeat of Matty Matthew's on August 30, 1900, is probably the welterweight title bout that gained the widest publicity of the title passing, though Ferns won title bouts earlier in the year.  Fern's loss of the title on December 18, 1901, to Joe Walcott was widely recognized as the date the welterweight title passed to Walcott from Ferns, as the bout garnered a great deal of publicity and Ferns lost decisively by knockout to a well known opponent.

Ferns continued boxing until around 1910 and took on some high-profile contenders, including three more bouts with Matty Matthews, and two each with Martin Duffy and Charley Sieger.   One of his last bouts was a loss to Wildcat Ferns on April 5, 1910, in Oklahoma City, Oklahoma.

Retirement from boxing and work as referee
Ferns worked as a referee from his early days in boxing, throughout his career, and into his retirement.  He refereed at least fourteen bouts between November 1899 and December 1922, including bouts with Wildcat Ferns, Kid Stein, Otto Knopp, Joe Leonard, and brothers Art and Dennis Magirl.  He refereed primarily in the New York area, and out west after his retirement from boxing.

Ferns died on June 11, 1952.

Official Professional boxing record

All Newspaper decisions are regarded as “no decision” bouts as they have “resulted in neither boxer winning or losing, and would therefore not count as part of their official fight record."

Unofficial Professional boxing record

Record with the inclusion of Newspaper decisions to the win/loss/draw column.

|-

|-

See also
Lineal championship
List of welterweight boxing champions

References

External links
 

1873 births
1952 deaths
Boxers from Philadelphia
People from Cherokee County, Kansas
American male boxers
World boxing champions
World welterweight boxing champions
Welterweight boxers